Kaliella hongkongensis is a species of air-breathing land snails or semi-slugs, terrestrial pulmonate gastropod mollusks in the family Chronidae. 

This species is endemic to Hong Kong.

References

 Yen, T.-C. (1939). Die chinesischen Land- und Süßwasser-Gastropoden des Natur-Museums Senckenberg. Abhandlungen der Senckenbergischen Naturforschenden Gesellschaft, 444: 1-233, pl. 1-16. Frankfurt am Main.

Chronidae
Taxonomy articles created by Polbot